Lomatium repostum is an uncommon species of flowering plant in the carrot family known by the common name Napa biscuitroot, or Napa lomatium. It is endemic to California, where it is known only from the northrthern California Coast Ranges surrounding the northern San Francisco Bay Area. It often grows in plant communities on serpentine soils.

Description
Lomatium repostum is a spreading perennial herb growing up to half a meter long from a slender taproot. There is generally no stem, the leaves and inflorescence emerging at ground level. The leaf blades are made up of sharp-toothed oval leaflets each up to 6 centimeters long. The inflorescence is an umbel of yellowish-green to purplish flowers.

External links
Jepson Manual Treatment - Lomatium repostum
USDA Plants Profile: Lomatium repostum
Lomatium repostum - Photo gallery

repostum
Endemic flora of California
Natural history of the California chaparral and woodlands
Natural history of the California Coast Ranges
Natural history of the San Francisco Bay Area
Taxa named by Willis Linn Jepson
Taxa named by Mildred Esther Mathias
Flora without expected TNC conservation status